The Man in Black is a 1950 British thriller film directed by Francis Searle and starring Betty Ann Davies, Sheila Burrell and Sid James. It was adapted by Hammer Film Productions from the popular British radio series Appointment with Fear featuring Valentine Dyall. Dyall (The "Man in Black" of the radio series) here provides the on screen introduction to the film, as "The Story-Teller".

Plot
After the death of her yogi father during a freak "yoga accident", Joan Clavering returns home to her widowed and suddenly very wealthy step-mother Bertha.  The latter conspires with her daughter Janice to drive Joan insane and deprive her of her rightful inheritance.

Critical reception
TV Guide wrote, "The story is drivel, with some unintentionally campy plot developments. It was adapted from a British radio series, perhaps proving that some dramas are better heard than seen."

Fantastic Movie Musings and Ramblings wrote, "One of Hammer's earlier forays into horror. This one is highly recommended."

Leonard Maltin called it a "clever little thriller with some surprises and a rare noncomic role for James."

References

External links

1948 films
1940s thriller films
British thriller films
Films directed by Francis Searle
Hammer Film Productions horror films
British black-and-white films
Films based on radio series
1950s English-language films
1940s English-language films
1940s British films
1950s British films